The Red Ace is a 1917 American adventure film serial directed by Jacques Jaccard. An incomplete print which is missing four chapters survives in the film archive of the Library of Congress.

Cast
 Marie Walcamp as Virginia Dixon
 Lawrence Peyton as Sergeant Sidney Winthrop (as Larry Peyton)
 L. M. Wells as Pierre Fouchard
Bobby Mack as Patrick Kelly
 Charles Brinley as Steele Heffern
 Harry Archer as Dr. Hertzman
 Noble Johnson as Little Bear

Chapter titles

 Silent Terror
 Lure of the Unattainable
 A Leap for Liberty 
 The Undercurrent
 In Mid-Air
 Fighting Blood
 The Lion's Claws
 Lair of the Beast
 A Voice from the Dead; or, Voice from the Past
 Hearts of Steel
 The Burning Span
 Overboard
 New Enemies
 The Fugitives
 Hell's Riders
 Virginia's Triumph

Reception
Like many American films of the time, The Red Ace was subject to cuts by city and state film censorship boards. The Chicago Board of Censors required, in Chapter 1, an attack by an ape-man be flashed and one on a chauffeur be cut; in Chapter 2, to flash an attack on a man; in Chapter 3, cut three scenes that showed a painting of a semi-nude woman and to flash a scene where the men in the foreground have a drink; in Chapter 4, cut a scene of a man at a bar shooting another man; in Chapter 6, cut the slugging of an Indian on the head with a rifle; in Chapter 7, cut two fight scenes, three struggle scenes of girl on stairs, all closeups of man with rope around neck, seven views of pulling of rope, view of man's body swinging in air, and the shooting of an Indian; in Chapter 11, the holdup and binding of the couple and two scenes of placing dynamite on the bridge; in Chapter 12, a closeup of the choking of a man; in Chapter 15, slugging a soldier and two scenes of men falling from horse; in Chapter 16, the last two scenes of dragging the young woman, man falling over after being shot, man falling over rock, two scenes of man laying on rock after being shot, man falling after shooting, and flash all scenes of gila monster.

See also
 List of film serials
 List of film serials by studio
 List of incomplete or partially lost films

References

External links

1917 films
1917 adventure films
American silent serial films
American black-and-white films
American adventure films
Universal Pictures film serials
Films directed by Jacques Jaccard
1910s American films
Silent adventure films
1910s English-language films